Lavis is a municipality in Northern Italy.

Lavis may also refer to:

 LAVIS (software) a software tool used in IC design
 Gilson Lavis (born 1951), former drummer for Squeeze
 Sidney Lavis (1873–1965), Anglican clergyman
 Neale Lavis (born 1930), Australian equestrian and Olympic champion